Devils River is the name of several rivers. These include:
Devil's River, Bulgaria
Devils River (Jamaica)
Devils River (Michigan)
Devils River (Texas)
Devils River (Wisconsin)